The Nabratein synagogue is an ancient synagogue and archaeological site in the upper Galilee region of the Northern District of Israel, located in a  pine forest northeast of Safed.

History
Naburiya was a Jewish village in the Galilee region of the Kingdom of Israel during the First and Second Temple periods.  Neburaya, identical with Nabratein, is located north of Safed and is the place where Eleazar of Modi'im and Jacob of Kfar Neburaya, a compiler of the Haggadah, are buried. The excavated remains of the Naburiya synagogue indicate that it is one of the oldest in the Galilee. The original synagogue was enlarged during the third century and destroyed in the Galilee earthquake of 363.

The final, and much larger, synagogue building was constructed in the late 6th century reusing stones from the earlier building. The year of its construction is known from the inscription over the main door, now displayed at the Israel Museum: “Built four hundred and ninety four years after the destruction of the Temple under the leadership of Hanina ben Lizar and Luliana bar Yuden.” The building stood until 640 CE. The façade was partially reconstructed by the Jewish National Fund and the Israel Antiquities Authority.

The seven-branched Menorah surrounded by a wreath over the door of the Henry S. Frank Memorial Synagogue in Philadelphia, Pennsylvania is copied from the Nabratein synagogue.

When Lieut. Kitchener of the Palestine Exploration Fund visited the site in 1877, he found the remains of the synagogue completely leveled to the ground and its columns fallen, along with a lintel of the main entrance.

Mishnaic scholar, R. Eleazar ha-Moda'i, is said to have been buried in Nabratein.

See also
 Ancient synagogues in Israel - refers to the modern State of Israel
 Ancient synagogues in Palestine - refers to the Palestinian Territories
 Archaeology of Israel
 Oldest synagogues in the world

Gallery

References

Archaeological sites in Israel
Ancient synagogues in the Land of Israel
2nd-century establishments in the Roman Empire
7th-century disestablishments in the Byzantine Empire